Jocelyn Penn (born September 10, 1979) is an American former professional basketball player. She played in the WNBA from 2003 to 2004. She was the ninth overall pick in the 2003 WNBA Draft, selected by the Charlotte Sting. She scored 50+ points, making her the first in 13 years to score two 50+ games in the same season (at the time of the accomplishment).

South Carolina statistics

Source

Personal life
Penn has a twin brother and two older sisters.

References

External links
WNBA.com: Jocelyn Penn Player Info
South Carolina Gamecocks bio

1979 births
Living people
African-American basketball players
All-American college women's basketball players
American women's basketball players
Basketball players from Georgia (U.S. state)
Forwards (basketball)
People from Conyers, Georgia
San Antonio Stars players
South Carolina Gamecocks women's basketball players
Sportspeople from the Atlanta metropolitan area
Washington Mystics players
21st-century African-American sportspeople
21st-century African-American women
20th-century African-American sportspeople
20th-century African-American women
20th-century African-American people